"Boogieman Blues" is a song written and recorded by Swedish singer Owe Thörnqvist. The song was released as a digital download in Sweden on 25 February 2017 and peaked at number 74 on the Swedish Singles Chart. It is taking part in Melodifestivalen 2017, and qualified to the final from the third semi-final on 18 February 2017.

Track listing

Chart performance

Weekly charts

Release history

References

2017 singles
2016 songs
Metronome Records singles
Swedish-language songs
Melodifestivalen songs of 2017
Songs written by Owe Thörnqvist